The Battle of Goodrich's Landing, Louisiana, was fought on June 29 and June 30, 1863, between Union and Confederate forces during the American Civil War. The Confederates attacked several Union regiments, who were composed mostly of black soldiers, in an attempt to disrupt the campaign at Vicksburg, Mississippi.

Background

Goodrich's Landing was a cotton plantation owned by Henry Goodrich of East Carroll Parish, Louisiana. Situated on the west bank of the Mississippi River, the landing served as a shipping point for area cotton planters. When Union forces invaded the region in early 1862, they seized the plantation and established it as a base of operations in their advance against Vicksburg. As hundreds of escaped slaves flocked to the Union camp, neighboring plantation owners abandoned their properties and evacuated to the west, into Confederate held territory. The U.S. Government subsequently confiscated these properties and leased them to Northern entrepreneurs, who employed former slaves to grow cotton. By the summer of 1863, Union forces under the command of General U.S. Grant, had surrounded and besieged the city of Vicksburg. Confederate troops in Louisiana and Arkansas believed that by raiding Goodrich's Landing, they could disrupt Grant's supply-chain and relieve their compatriots at Vicksburg.

Battle

In June 1863, Confederates from Gaines's Landing, Arkansas, undertook an expedition to Lake Providence, Louisiana, in an effort to disrupt the Union assault on Vicksburg. The Union had constructed fortifications, on top of an old Indian mound about five miles northwest of Goodrich's Landing, guarding a military supply depot. The Confederates planned to attack the fort on June 29, but decided to demand an unconditional surrender first, which the Union forces accepted. Later in the day, Confederate Col. William H. Parsons encountered companies of the 1st Kansas Mounted Infantry and routed them. The Confederates then seized Union Army supplies stored at the landing, and began burning cotton on surrounding plantations (the Governor of Louisiana had issued orders for all cotton crops within the state to be destroyed, thereby keeping it out of Union hands). By the next morning, U.S. Naval boats had landed the Mississippi Marine Brigade, under the command of Brig. Gen. Alfred W. Ellet, at Goodrich's Landing. At dawn, he set out with Col. William F. Wood's black troops to find the Confederate raiders. Ellet's cavalry encountered the enemy first and began skirmishing. The fight became more intense as Wood's forces approached. Parsons eventually disengaged and fell back, taking his captured supplies with him.

Aftermath

Although the Confederate expedition was successful, having disrupted Union operations and captured much-needed supplies, the raid failed in its primary objective, which was to divert Union attention from the siege at Vicksburg. The following month, on July 4, the Confederate forces at Vicksburg surrendered and the Union gained undisputed control of the Mississippi River.

References

External links
 CWSAC Report Update

Goodrich's Landing
Goodrich's Landing
Goodrich's Landing
Goodrich's Landing
East Carroll Parish, Louisiana
1863 in Louisiana
June 1863 events